Julia Joyce (born 14 June 1998) is an actress, known for her appearance as a younger version of Billie Piper's characters in Doctor Who ("Father's Day") and Mansfield Park, as well as for a role in Ruby in the Smoke. She is also the younger sister of the actress, model and Petits Filous advert star Lucy Joyce; Julia later went on to become the face of Petits Filous in her own right.

Filmography

Television

Film

References
 

British television actresses
1998 births
Living people
British child actresses
Place of birth missing (living people)